Freeze may refer to:

Liquids turning to solids 

 Freezing, the physical process of a liquid turning into a solid
 Directional freezing, freezing from only one direction or side

Cessation of movement or change 

Freeze (b-boy move), the halting of all movement in a clever position
freeze, an old command-line compressor program
Freeze (computing), a condition when computer software becomes unresponsive
Freeze (software engineering), a period of stricter rules for changing the software during its development

Types of freezes
 Brain freeze, a common alternate name for a cold-stimulus headache
Budget freeze, when a budget for a government or business is held at a specific level
Credit freeze, the act of locking data at a consumer reporting agency
Deep Freeze (disambiguation), various meanings
Estate freeze, a legal estate-planning technique used in Canada
Nuclear freeze, an agreement to cease production of new nuclear arms
Tuition freeze, a government policy restricting the increase of tuition fees

Related terms
Freeze brand, a branding process that involves the use of liquid nitrogen or dry ice and alcohol
Freeze-drying, a method of rapidly removing moisture from food products
Freeze-frame shot, when a single frame of content shows repeatedly on the screen
Freeze spray, a type of aerosol spray product
Freeze stat, a temperature sensing device

People 
 with Freeze as a surname
Amy Freeze (born 1974), American television meteorologist
Daddy Freeze (contemporary), Nigerian radio host and presenter
Dr. Freeze (contemporary), American singer, songwriter and record producer
Frosty Freeze (1963–2008), American breakdancer
Hugh Freeze (born 1969), American college football coach
J. Donald Freeze (1932–2006), American theologian and educator
Jake Freeze (1900–1983), American professional baseball pitcher
John Gosse Freeze (1825–1913), American lawyer and writer
Lillie T. Freeze (1855–1937), American leader within The Church of Jesus Christ of Latter-day Saints
Samuel Freeze (1778–1844), Canadian farmer and political figure in New Brunswick
with Freeze as a nickname
Freeze (video game player), Aleš Kněžínek, Czech League of Legends player
 Robert "Freeze" Riggs, Michael Alig's roommate and accomplice in murdering fellow Club Kid Angel Melendez
fictional characters
Mr. Freeze, supervillain in American comic books published by DC Comics
 The Freeze, a spandex-clad sprinter who races fans at home games of the Atlanta Braves

Sports teams
Chicago Freeze, junior ice hockey team in the North American Hockey League (1997–2003)
Cleveland Freeze, American professional indoor soccer team (2013–2014)
Erie Freeze, American indoor football team (2005–2007)
Fargo Freeze, professional indoor American football team (2000)
Flintshire Freeze, Welsh ice hockey team (1998–2012)
Fresno Freeze FC, American soccer team in the Women's Premier Soccer League (WPSL), founded in 2014
Minnesota Freeze, United States Australian Football League (USAFL) team, founded in 2005

Places 
Freeze, Idaho, a community in Latah County, Idaho
Freeze Fork, West Virginia, a community in Logan County, West Virginia
 Freeze Out, California, a historical name for Ione, California

Structures 
Freeze Building, a historic building in San Angelo, Texas
Freeze Lounge, a chain of ice bars in New Delhi, India
Mr. Freeze (roller coaster), a shuttle roller coaster in Texas and Missouri

Art, entertainment, and media

Music

Groups 
Freeez, 1980s UK dance music and jazz funk group from London
The Freeze, a punk rock band from Boston, Massachusetts, formed in 1978
The Freeze (Scottish band), a punk band from Edinburgh, Scotland, active 1976–1981

Albums 
Freeze (album), the tenth studio album by Herman Brood & His Wild Romance
Freeze! (EP), the second external play by Momoland

Songs 
"Freeze" (Bloodline song)
"Freeze" (Jordin Sparks song)
"Freeze" (Kygo song), 2022
"Freeze" (LL Cool J song), 2006
"Freeze" (Momoland song), 2017
"Freeze" (Queen Elvis song)
"Freeze" (T-Pain song)
"Freeze" (Todd Smith song)
"The Freeze", solo debut by Albert Collins, 1958
"Freeze", Part IV of "Fear" by Rush
"Freeze", a song by Pepper from the album Pink Crustaceans and Good Vibrations
"The Freeze" (Spandau Ballet song)
 "The Freeze" by Lene Lovich from the album Flex
 "Freeze", by Take That from III
 "Freeze", by Bladee from Gluee

Other art, entertainment, and media
Freeze!, a puzzle video game released in 2012
Freeze (art exhibition), a 1988 art show held by various UK artists in London Docklands
Freeze (TV series), a 2006 South Korean miniseries
Freez FM, a Dutch pop and rock music radio station

See also 

Freeze frame (disambiguation)
Freezer (disambiguation)
Freezing (disambiguation)
Frieze (disambiguation)
Frozen (disambiguation)